Biñan's at-large congressional district is the congressional district of the Philippines in Biñan. It has been represented in the House of Representatives of the Philippines since 2016. Previously included in Laguna's 1st congressional district, it includes all barangays of the city. It is currently represented in the 19th Congress by Marlyn Alonte-Naguiat of the Lakas–CMD, who is the district's first representative since its creation.

Representation history

Election results

2016

2019

2022

See also
Legislative district of Biñan

References

Congressional districts of the Philippines
Politics of Laguna (province)
2015 establishments in the Philippines
At-large congressional districts of the Philippines
Congressional districts of Calabarzon
Constituencies established in 2015